Tiina Lokk-Tramberg (born 1 October 1955) is an Estonian filmmaker, film teacher and politician, who was a member of the Riigikogu from 2012 to 2015, representing the Estonian Reform Party.

Early life and education
Born in Tallinn, Lokk graduated from the Gerasimov Institute of Cinematography in Moscow with a degree in film theory and criticism.

Career
Since 1997, she has been the director of the Tallinn Black Nights Film Festival, and later became a member of the European Film Academy. She also has been a member of the editorial board, screenwriter and art council of Tallinnfilm for a decade before being a freelance journalist for the Tallinn Black Nights Film Festival. She then founded and directed the movie label FilmaMAX. She has been a lecturer in the Estonian Academy of Music and Theater (cultural organization) and the Estonian Academy of Arts (teaching film history, film scripts and management of cultural projects) and a professor of scriptwriting at the Baltic Film and Media School. On 21 May 2012, the Tallinn University senate elected Lokk as Professor of Film and Art at the Baltic Film and Media School.

She has been a member of the Estonian Reform Party since 2006 and was a member of the Riigikogu from 2012 to 2015. She was promoted to the Riigikogu as an alternate member as later prime minister Taavi Rõivas became Minister of Social Affairs and Jaanus Rahumägi, who had originally replaced him, withdrew from the Riigikogu.

Personal life 
Lokk has two daughters: Triin and Martina.

Her hobbies include cooking, hiking, and travelling.

Lokk's favorite films include One Flew Over the Cuckoo's Nest, Citizen Kane, Amarcord, and Pulp Fiction.

Awards 
 5th class of the Order of the White Star (received 22 February 2002)
 Foreign Ministry Culture Prize, 2010

References

External links 
 Tiina Lokk-Tramberg's profile at the Riigikogu website
 Interview at the Reet Linnale, Tähelaev, ETV, 21. november 2010
 Priit Luts. "Riigikogu liige Tiina Lokk-Tramberg andis ametivande" ERR, 12. December 2012
 

1955 births
Living people
People from Tallinn
Politicians from Tallinn
Estonian film directors
Estonian Reform Party politicians
Women members of the Riigikogu
Members of the Riigikogu, 2011–2015
Estonian journalists
Estonian women journalists
Recipients of the Order of the White Star, 5th Class
Estonian women film directors
21st-century Estonian politicians
21st-century Estonian women politicians